Galmiz railway station is a railway station in the municipality of Galmiz, in the Swiss canton of Fribourg. It is an intermediate stop on the standard gauge Palézieux–Lyss line of Swiss Federal Railways.

Services 
The following services stop at Galmiz:

References

External links 
 
 

Railway stations in the canton of Fribourg
Swiss Federal Railways stations